Crete Civic Center is a multi-purpose indoor arena in Plattsburgh, New York. It was briefly home to the Plattsburgh Pioneers of the Quebec Major Junior Hockey League. More recently, the Crete has hosted several professional wrestling events that have been put on by Total Nonstop Action Wrestling. In August 2015, then Presidential Candidate Donald Trump held a rally at the center. The City of Plattsburgh currently utilizes the arena for indoor soccer.

External links

References

Indoor ice hockey venues in the United States
Quebec Major Junior Hockey League arenas
Sports venues in New York (state)
Sports venues in Clinton County, New York
Indoor soccer venues in New York (state)
1974 establishments in New York (state)
Sports venues completed in 1974